Dulla is a Union Parishad under Muktagachha Upazila in Mymensingh District, Bangladesh.

References
travelingluck.com

Populated places in Mymensingh Division
Mymensingh District